The Roman Catholic Diocese of Brejo is a diocese located in the city of Brejo in the Ecclesiastical province of São Luís do Maranhão in Brazil.

History
 14 September 1971: Established as Diocese of Brejo from Metropolitan Archdiocese of São Luís do Maranhão

Bishops
 Bishops of Brejo (Latin Rite)
Afonso de Oliveira Lima, S.D.S. † (29 Nov 1971 - 25 Sep 1991) Retired
Valter Carrijo, S.D.S. (25 Sep 1991 Succeeded - 5 May 2010) Retired
José Valdeci Santos Mendes (5 May 2010 – present)

Coadjutor bishop
Valter Carrijo, S.D.S. (1989-1991)

References
 GCatholic.org
 Catholic Hierarchy

Roman Catholic dioceses in Brazil
Christian organizations established in 1971
Brejo, Roman Catholic Diocese of
Roman Catholic dioceses and prelatures established in the 20th century